Makutano is a settlement in Kenya's Kirinyaga County.

Location
The coordinates of Makutano are: 0°45'24.0"S, 37°16'44.0"E (Latitude:-0.756663; Longitude:37.278887).

Overview
At the beginning of 2016, a dual carriage highway through Makutano, referred to as the Kenol–Makutano–Sagana–Marua Highway, part of the greater Cape to Cairo Road, was considered.

See also
 List of power stations in Kenya
 List of roads in Kenya

References

External links
About Kirinyaga County, Kenya

Populated places in Kirinyaga County